The 2022 election to Moray Council took place on 5 May 2022, on the same day as the 31 other local authorities in Scotland. The election used the eight wards created under the Local Governance (Scotland) Act 2004, with 26 Councillors elected. Each ward elects either 3 or 4 members, using the STV electoral system.

On 18 May 2022, it was announced that the council would be run by a minority Conservative group, alongside two Independents.

2017 results

Results 

|- class="unsortable" align="centre"
!rowspan=2 align="left"|Ward
! % 
!Cllrs
! %
!Cllrs
! %
!Cllrs
! %
!Cllrs
! %
!Cllrs
! %
!Cllrs
!rowspan=2|TotalCllrs
|- class="unsortable" align="center"
!colspan=2 bgcolor="" | SNP
!colspan=2 bgcolor="" | Lab
!colspan=2 bgcolor=""| Conservative
!colspan=2 bgcolor="" | Green
!colspan=2 bgcolor="" | Lib Dem
!colspan=2 bgcolor="white"| Others
|-
|align="left"|Speyside Glenlivet
|bgcolor="" |36.77
|bgcolor="" |1
|colspan="2" 
|33.83
|1
|8.57
|0
|colspan="2" 
|20.83
|1
|3
|-
|align="left"|Keith & Cullen
|43.50
|1
|colspan="2" 
|bgcolor="#add8e6"|43.68
|bgcolor="#add8e6"|2
|colspan="2" 
|9.94
|0
|2.88
|0
|3
|-
|align="left"|Buckie
| 
|1
|colspan="2" 
| 
|1
|colspan="2" 
| 
|1
| 
|colspan="1" 
|3
|-
|align="left"|Fochabers Lhanbryde
|bgcolor="" |42.99
|bgcolor="" |1
|10.11
|1
|39.79
|1
|colspan="6" 
|3
|-
|align="left"|Heldon & Laich
|29.48
|1
|7.68
|1
|bgcolor="#add8e6"|39.71
|bgcolor="#add8e6"|2
|colspan="2" 
|4.62
|0
|18.52
|1
|3
|-
|align="left"|Elgin City North
|bgcolor="" |32.60
|bgcolor="" |1
|28.49
|1
|25.88
|1
|4.49
|0
|3.92
|0
|4.62
|0
|3
|-
|align="left"|Elgin City South
|bgcolor="" |35.55
|bgcolor="" |1
|28.11
|1
|26.83
|1
|colspan="2" 
|3.05
|0
|6.45
|0
|4
|-
|align="left"|Forres
|34.29
|1
|10.62
|0
|bgcolor="#add8e6"|40.91
|bgcolor="#add8e6"|2
|9.1
|1
|colspan="2" 
|5.10
|0
|4
|- class="unsortable" class="sortbottom" style="background:#C9C9C9"
|align="left"| Total
|
|
|
|
|
|
|
|
|
|
|
|
|26
|-
|}

Ward results
The incumbent councillors for each ward as of March 2022 are listed below. Any changes from the councillors elected in the 2017 Moray Council election are also noted. Candidates for the upcoming election were confirmed on 30 March 2022.

Speyside Glenlivet

Keith & Cullen
Incumbent councillors:
Donald Gatt, Scottish Conservatives
Theresa Coull, Scottish National Party
Laura Powell, Scottish Conservatives. Replaced Ron Shepherd (Independent) in November 2019.

{| class="wikitable"

Buckie
Incumbent councillors:
Tim Eagle, Scottish Conservatives
Gordon Cowie, Councillors Open Group (elected as Independent)
Sonya Warren, Scottish National Party
Candidates (uncontested):

Fochabers Lhanbryde
2012: 1xSNP; 1xCon; 1xLab
2017: 1xCon; 2xSNP
2012-2017 Change: SNP gain one seat from Lab

Elgin City North
Incumbent councillors:
Frank Brown, Scottish Conservatives
Maria McLean, Scottish Conservatives. Replaced Sandy Cooper (Independent) in July 2017.
Vacancy. Paula Coy (Scottish National Party) was elected in 2017.

Elgin City North

Elgin City South

Forres
Incumbent councillors:
Claire Feaver, Scottish Conservatives
Aaron McLean, Scottish National Party
George Alexander, Councillors Open Group (elected as Independent)
Lorna Creswell, Councillors Open Group (elected as Independent)

Footnotes

Changes since 2022

By-elections since 2022

References

Moray Council elections
Moray